Jessica Dee Humphreys is a Canadian author, indexer, and journalist specializing in international humanitarian, military, and children's issues.

Education
Humphreys received her Honours Bachelor of Arts in English Literature and Linguistics from the University of Toronto in 1997, and the following year received her Master of Arts degree in English Literature from Canada's Queen's University.  She then held an internship at the United Nations Development Fund for Women in New York.

Career
A writer, as well as a book indexer, Humphreys co-authored two books with Roméo Dallaire Waiting for First Light: My Ongoing Battle with PTSD and They Fight Like Soldiers, They Die Like Children She has also written two books for children, Child Soldier: When Boys and Girls are Used in War and The International Day of the Girl: Celebrating Girls Around the World (foreword by Rona Ambrose).  Humphreys has been a regular contributor to the Toronto Star since 2020.

Awards and recognition
Humphreys's work was included in the National Post's list of Best Books of 2016 and the 2010 Globe and Mail's Top 100: Non-fiction. Her work has been awarded the 2017 Ontario Library Association's Forest of Reading Red Maple Award for children's non-fiction, the 2015 Best Bet for Junior Non-Fiction from the Ontario Library Association, the 2016 Skipping Stones Honour Award, the Children’s Literature Roundtable of Canada Honour Book of 2016, and starred reviews from the School Library Journal  and Quill and Quire, plus nominations for the 2016 Eisner Award Best Publication for Kids, the 2016 Norma Fleck Award for Canadian Children’s Non-Fiction, the 2016 Canadian Library Association’s Book of the Year for Children, the Joe Shuster Dragon Award, the 2016-2017 Hackmatack Children’s Choice Book Award, the Young Adult Library Services Association's ‘Great Graphic Novel for Teens 2016’, the American Library Association’s 2016 Notable Children’s Book, and the 2017 Forest of Reading Golden Oak award for non-fiction. Her book Waiting for First Light, was longlisted for the Taylor Prize for Literary Non-Fiction and for CBC's Canada Reads competition.

Publications
 Co author with Roméo Dallaire Waiting for First Light, Random House Canada 2016 
 Co author with Michel Chikwanine Child Soldier, Kids Can Press 2015 
 To Three and Beyond (contributor), Praeclarus Press 2014 
 Co author with Roméo Dallaire They Fight Like Soldiers, They Die Like Children, Vintage Canada  2010 
 The International Day of the Girl: Celebrating Girls Around the World (Foreword by Rona Ambrose), Kids Can Press 2020

References

Canadian children's writers
University of Toronto alumni
Living people
Year of birth missing (living people)
Queen's University at Kingston alumni